The Bears and the Bees is a Silly Symphonies animated Disney short film. It was released in 1932.

Plot
Two bear cubs tussle harmlessly, then start to munch on a berry bush, until a bigger, meaner bear chases them off. They nibble some flowers and find a bee, which they follow to the hive, which they then proceed to raid. The big bear chases them off, but unknown to him, a bee spotted the raid and has summoned the attack squad. The bees run him off, and the cubs dig in.

Home media
The short was released on December 19, 2006, on Walt Disney Treasures: More Silly Symphonies, Volume Two.

References

External links
 
 

1932 films
1932 short films
1930s Disney animated short films
Animated films about bears
Animated films about insects
Films directed by Wilfred Jackson
Films produced by Walt Disney
Silly Symphonies
1932 animated films
American black-and-white films
Animated films without speech
1930s American films